My Dear Bootham is an 2022 Indian Tamil-language children's fantasy comedy film written and directed by N. Ragavan of Manjapai and  Kadamban fame, and produced by Ramesh P. Pillai under the banner of Abhishek Films. It stars Prabhu Deva as the title role with Ashwanth Ashokkumar. The film's music and score is composed by D. Imman, with cinematography by U. K. Senthil Kumar and editing done by San Lokesh.The film marks the second collaboration between Prabhu Deva and Remya Nambeesan after Mercury.

The film was released in theatres on 15 July 2022 and opened to positive reviews from critics and audiences with praised the social message and Prabhu Deva and Ashwanth's performance.

Plot 
The movie starts in the genie world where the King of all, Karkimuki is sad as he has no son for all these years. After praying to Lord Murugan, his wishes come true and he gets a son. He shows all the love he supressed these years and loves him unconditionally. One day, his son asks him to take him to the planet where Siddhars live and so Karkimuki takes him there. Accidentally, his son enters a deep burrow to hide from his father where he disturbs a Siddhar's thavam that has been continuing for thousand years. The angry Siddhar wakes up and curses Karkimuki saying that he will be sent to Earth as a statue and if he is released by someone, that one has to say a mandaram for Karkimuki to return to the Genie World within 48 days or he will perish in the air. 

Thirunavukarusu (Thiru) is an ordinary kid who becomes a stammerer after an accident that kills his dad. Because of this, he gets bullied in school by his classmates and the teachers who does not allow him to read out loud due his stammering problem. Even the shopkeeper is impatient to listen to what Thiru wants to buy so asks him to write down whatever he wants. His mother does not listen either, but loves him dearly. 

One day on a school trip, Thiru is chased by a dog and falls in a ditch where he finds a doll and releases Karkimuki. Karkimuki calls Thiru as Deivam and scares Thiru. Karkimuki follows Thiru home, only for Thiru to realise only he can see the genie. Eventually, they become friends and Thiru plays a joke on everyone who used to make fun of him. He asks all his wishes to Karkimuni and has fun. When the teacher announces of an inter-school speaking contest at school,Thiru wishes to participate but gets scared because of his stammer. He asks Karkimuki to get rid of stammer and Karkimuni agrees. He starts speaking at the contest only to start stammering again. 

Thiru gets upset and cries on the stage, wetting his pants. His mum is helpless and comforts him. Thiru does not go to school for the next few days and decides to stay home. Thiru shouts at Karkimuki for tricking him and Karkimuki apologises saying genies have some rules they must never break such as never bringing someone from dead, never to stop time and to never to cure problems related to the mind. Karkimuki says Thiru has a problem related to his mind and not a health condition.Thiru tells Karkimuki never to speak to him again. During a robbery, Karkimuki manages to save Thiru's mum so they become friends again. Karkimuki encourages him to ignore everyone and to go to school so he decides to go but promises his mum he will never do anything without telling his mum first. 

At school, there is another contest and Thiru manages to win first prize, shocking everyone who underestimated him. He hides this from his mum as he thinks she will get mad at him. Thiru asks Karkimuki what he wants and Karkimuki tells him everything that happened, bringing tears to Thiru. Thiru assures Karkimuki that he will say the mandaram and reunite him with his son. Day after day, he practices the mandaram but struggles. One day, as he is practicing his mum catches him and asks him what it is. He runs away but she hits him and asks him. Watching this, Karkimuki reveals himself to her and she gets scared. Karkimuki decides to go away as Thiru's mum is very scared. Later, Thiru shouts at his mum for sending the genie away as he was the only person who patiently listened to him and no one else listened to him including her. 

He runs up to the terrace to find Karkimuki slowly fading away.Thiru cries and gets angry trying to say the mandaram.He finally manages to say the mandaram and it opens a portal for Karkimuki to go back to the genie world. As he is about to leave, a kite string out of nowhere flies across and slits the throat of Thiru's mum, thus killing her. Karkimuki watches as Thiru cries over his dead mum and decides to bring her back to life which causes Karkimuki to die as he has disobeyed his rules. Thiru and his mum hugs in tears while Karkimuki vanishes dancing happily. A final scene shows Thiru speaking in a contest without stammering.

Cast
Prabhu Deva as Karkimuki, the Genie
Ashwanth Ashokkumar as Thirunavukarasu
Remya Nambeesan as Thirunavukarasu's Mother
Shakthi Rithvik as Thirunavukarasu's friend
Saathvik as Thirunavukarasu's friend
Master Param Guganesh as Thirunavukarasu's friend
Aazhiya as Thirunavukarasu's friend
Samyuktha Shanmuganathan as Thirunavukarasu's Teacher
Imman Annachi as Shop Owner 
Swaminathan as Thirunavukarasu's Relative
Suresh Chandra Menon as Doctor

Music

D. Imman composed the soundtrack and film's score.This is the first collaboration with N. Ragavan and second Collaboration with Prabhu Deva after Pon Manickavel.The audio rights were sold to Think Music India.The first single "Master Oh My Master" were released on 16 December 2021 and Sung by Benny Dayal.The second single "Enakku Mattum Yean Yean" was released on 16 June 2022.The third single "Abacca Darru" was released on 7 July 2022.The entire soundtrack album was released on 17 July 2022 after the film's release.

Release and reception
The film released in theatres on 15 July 2022.

M. Suganth of The Times of India rated the film 2.5 out of 5 and wrote that "If the film works to the extent it does, it is mainly due to the two leads. Prabhudeva, who has often shown a flair for comedy, tries to elevate the material by giving his all, while Ashwath scores in the emotional moments, especially his monologue in the climax". Navein Darshan of Cinema Express gave 3.5 out of 5 stars and opined that "Fun-filled visuals and ideas make up for the sobby parts of this overly melodramatic film".

Galata Tamil gave 2.5 out of 5 and stated that "My Dear Bootham is a potential fantasy film mainly catered to kids!". Only Kollywood gave the film’s rating 3 out of 5 stating that "There are a couple of good moments in the film’s runtime, but the others are mostly marred by kiddish events. Credit must go however to both Prabhu Deva and Ashwath who have put their best foot forward to make this film worthwhile. On the whole, My Dear Bootham is a watchable film for adults and they could enjoy it more if they balance their film viewing experience with the reactions of their kids, who are sure to love this film."

Home media
The post-theatrical streaming rights of the film was bought by ZEE5 and the satellite rights of the film was bought by Zee Tamil and Zee Thirai.WTP on November 27' 2022 on Sunday @1pm.

References

External links
 

Films shot in Madurai